Dalbergia occulta  is a species of flowering plant in the legume family Fabaceae. It is endemic to Madagascar. Its original description was based on a single collection, which explains its botanical name (from the Latin word occultus "hidden, concealed").

Similar species 
 Dalbergia maritima

Conservation status 
The IUCN Red List lists Dalbergia occulta as critically endangered.

Due to overexploitation and the risk of confusion with similar species, Dalbergia occulta and other Dalbergia species from Madagascar were listed in CITES Appendix II in 2013, currently with a zero export quota.

References 

maritima
Endemic flora of Madagascar
Endangered plants
Taxonomy articles created by Polbot